Losojocha or Losoccocha (possibly from Quechua qucha lake) is a  mountain in the Apolobamba mountain range in the Andes of Peru. It is located in the Puno Region, Putina Province, Sina District. Losojocha lies southwest of Locopauchenta, west of Cunuyo and northwest of Sorapata. It is near the Lusuni pass at the border with Bolivia.

References

Mountains of Peru
Mountains of Puno Region